Sidda Raghava Rao (born 10 August 1957) is an Indian politician who is an ex-Minister for Environment, Forests, Science and Technology in the Andhra Pradesh cabinet. He earlier worked as a Minister for Transport, Roads & Buildings. Born in Chimakurthy of Prakasam district (in Andhra Pradesh) to Sidda Venkata Subbamma and Sidda Venkateswarlu, Raghava Rao grew up in a large family of eight brothers. He completed his schooling at Chimakurthy and went to Bapatla to pursue intermediate. He later graduated in Commerce from Andhra University in 1977. Raghava Rao joined the YSR Congress Party in June, 2020 after losing the 2019 Lok Sabha Elections from Ongole on a TDP ticket.

2014 Election
Raghava Rao won the 2014 Assembly elections from Darsi constituency and became a minister in the N. Chandrababu Naidu cabinet. Telugu Desam Party won the Darsi seat after 15 long years. Telugu Desam Party formed the government in the bifurcated state of Andhra Pradesh in June 2014.

Ministerial roles
Raghava Rao was made the Minister for Transport, Roads & Buildings. 

He has revamped the Andhra Pradesh State Road Transport Corporation's (APSRTC) after the bifurcation with modernisation of bus stations.  84 JNNURM buses equipped with GPS services were introduced during his period. An additional 30 new AC buses and 311 new services were implemented during Raghava Rao's tenure as minister. APSRTC began to explore the usage of bus stations as commercial spaces for the first time  to  generate revenue for the corporation. 

Observing the deaths due to road accidents occurred because of two-wheeler riders not wearing head protection (helmet), Raghava Rao made it mandatory for all to wear helmets. A study was carried out to identify accident prone areas for immediate repair. The Roads department moved swiftly to repair them, thus reducing accident rate.

Awards and recognition
 "Indira Priyadarshini"Award by National Unity Conference, New Delhi
 "Jewel of India" International President Council, New Delhi
 "Sri Vasavi" – Vasavi Seva Samithi Guntur
 "Ghantasala Sevaratna" by Ghantasala National Arts Academy, Hyderabad
 "Sahiti Poshaka" Abhinava Krishna Devaraya’ – Akshara Sahiti – Ongole
 "Dharma Prakash ‘’ Award – 2013 at Bangalore by All India Arya Vysya Maha Sabha

References

1957 births
Living people
People from Prakasam district

te:శిద్దా రాఘవరావు